The Insects of Hawaii series, now under the editorship of James K. Liebherr of Cornell University, aims to provide a collaborative, comprehensive, taxonomy of all known Hawaiian insect fauna. So far, more than 5,000 native arthropod species have been described. Only vols. 1, 16, and 17 are still in print, but the out-of-print volumes are being scanned and added to the University of Hawaii's digital repository.

 1. Reissue of the Introduction. Elwood C. Zimmerman, with new Foreword by James K. Liebherr and short biography of the author by James O. Juvik. (2001) - Geological History of Hawaii: Derivation, Dispersal, and Distribution. Evolution and Development, Analyses and Summaries of Biota
 16. Hawaiian Carabidae (Coleoptera). James K. Liebherr and Elwood C. Zimmerman. (2000) - Part 1: Introduction and Tribe Platynini
 17. Hawaiian Hylaeus (Nesoprosopis) Bees. Howell V. Daly and Karl N. Magnacca. (2003) - Hymenoptera: Apoidea

The out-of-print volumes follow:
 1. Introduction. Elwood C. Zimmerman. (1947) - Geological History of Hawaii: Derivation, Dispersal, and Distribution. Evolution and Development, Analyses and Summaries of Biota
 2. Apterygota to Thysanoptera. Elwood C. Zimmerman. (1948) - Thysanura, Diplura, Protura, Collembola, Orthoptea, Isoptera, Embioptera, Dermaptera, Zoraptera, Corrondentia, Mallophaga, Anoplura, Odonata, Thysanoptera
 3. Heteroptera. Elwood C. Zimmerman. (1948) - Cydnidae, Pentatomidae, Coreidae, Lygaeidea, Tingidae, Enicocephalidae, Reduviidea, Nabidae, Cimicidae, Anthocoridae, Cryptostemmatidae, Miridae, Saldidae, Hebridae, Mesoveliidae, Veliidae, Gerridae, Notonectidae, Corixidae
 4. Homoptera: Auchenorhyncha. Elwood C. Zimmerman. (1948) - Cercopidae, Cicadellidae, Membracidae, Cixiidae, Delphacidae, Flatidae
 5. Homoptera: Sternorhyncha. Elwood C. Zimmerman. (1948) - Psylloidea, Aleyrodoidea, Aphidoidea, Coccoidea
 6. Ephemeroptera-Neuroptera-Trichoptera and Supplement to Volumes 1-5. Elwood C. Zimmerman. (1957, out of print)
 7. Macrolepidoptera. Elwood C. Zimmerman. (1958) - Geometridae, Noctuidae, Sphingidae, Pieridae, Nymphalidae, Danaidae, Lycaenidae
 8. Lepidoptera: Pyraloidea. Elwood C. Zimmerman. (1958) - Galleriinae, Pyraustinae, Scopariinae, Nymphulinae, Pyralinae, Crambinae, Phycitinae, Pterophoridae, Alucitidae
 9. Microlepidoptera. Elwood C. Zimmerman. (1978) - Monotrysia, Tineoidea, Tortricoidea, Gracillarioidea, Yponomeutoidea, Alucitoidea, Gelechioidea 
 10. Diptera: Nematocera-Brachycera (except Dolichopodidae). D. Elmo Hardy. (1960) - Tipulidae, Psychodidae, Culicidae, Chironomidae, Ceratopogonidae, Scatopsidae, Mycetophilidae, Sciaridae, Cecidomyiidae, Stratiomyidae, Bombyliidae, Scenopinidae, Empididae
 11. Diptera: Brachycera II-Cyclorrhapha. I. D. Elmo Hardy. (1964) - Dolichopodidae, Phoridae, Lonchopteridae, Pipunculidae, Syrphidae
 11, Supplement. Diptera: Dolichopodidae and Appendix (Phoridae). JoAnn M. Tenorio. (1969)
 12. Diptera: Cyclorrhapha II. D. Elmo Hardy. (1965) - Series Schizophora, Section Acalypterae I, Family Drosophilidae
 13. Diptera: Cyclorrhapha III. D. Elmo Hardy and M. D. Delfinado. (1980) - Series Schizophora, Section Acalypterae, Exclusive of Family Drosophilidae
 14. Diptera: Cyclorrhapha IV. D. Elmo Hardy. (1981) - Series Schizophora, Section Calyptratae
 15. Collembola. Kenneth Christiansen and Peter Bellinger. (1992) - Suborder Arthropleona; Suborder Symphypleona

References

External links
 CSIRO Publishing: Australian Weevils
 University of Hawaii Press: Insects of Hawaii
 University of Hawaii Digital Repository: Insects of Hawaii
 ScholarSpace

 
Fauna of Hawaii
Hawaii
Natural history of Hawaii